Sclerocoelus is a genus of flies belonging to the family Sphaeroceridae, the lesser dung flies.

Species
Species include:
Sclerocoelus andensis Marshall, 1997
Sclerocoelus brasilensis Marshall, 1997
Sclerocoelus caribensis Marshall, 1997
Sclerocoelus clarae (Papp, 1973)
Sclerocoelus galapagensis Marshall, 1997
Sclerocoelus hemorrhoidalis Marshall, 1997
Sclerocoelus plumiseta (Duda, 1925)
Sclerocoelus rectangularis (Malloch, 1914)
Sclerocoelus regularis (Malloch, 1914)
Sclerocoelus sordipes (Adams, 1904)
Sclerocoelus subbrevipennis (Frey, 1954)

References

Sphaeroceridae
Diptera of North America
Diptera of South America
Sphaeroceroidea genera